Homelessness is the condition of people without a regular dwelling.

Homeless may also refer to:

 Homeless (film), a 2006 documentary on homelessness
 "Homeless" (Leona Lewis song), 2007
 "Homeless" (Marina Kaye song), 2014
 "Homeless" (Paul Simon and Ladysmith Black Mambazo song), 1986
 "Homeless", a 1998 song by Love Inc.
 The Homeless, a 1974 Japanese film directed by Kōichi Saitō